Catherine G. Constable is an Australian earth scientist who is a professor at the Scripps Institution of Oceanography. Her research considers palaeo- and geo-magnetism. Constable was awarded the American Geophysical Union William Gilbert Award in 2013 and elected Fellow of the American Association for the Advancement of Science in 2017.

Early life and education 
Constable was born in St Andrews. At the age of eleven her family moved to Australia. She completed her high school education in Perth and attended the University of Western Australia for her undergraduate studies. As a graduate student, Constable moved to the Australian National University. Her master's dissertation investigated the variations in holocene geomagnetism in Queensland. She was a doctoral researcher at the Scripps Institution of Oceanography, where she continued to study geomagnetism and focussed on statistical analysis.

Research and career 
Constable was appointed to the faculty at the Scripps Institution of Oceanography after completing her doctoral degree, where she was eventually made a Professor of Geophysics. She has continued to study the time variation of geomagnetic fields and how these dynamical processes impact the deep interior of planet Earth.

Academic service 
From 2006 to 2009, Constable was Head of the Earth Section at the Scripps Institution of Oceanography. In 2009, she was made Deputy Director for Research and Associate Vice Chancellor for Marine Sciences. Alongside her work at the Scripps Institution, Constable held various positions of leadership at the American Geophysical Union. She oversaw the geomagnetism and paleomagnetism (GP) communities. Constable was involved with the Future Focus Task Force of the AGU and contributed to the Mission Alignment Project (MAP). She was elected to the Board of Directors of the AGU in 2013.

Awards and honours 
 1997 Royal Astronomical Society Price Medal for Geomagnetism
 1999 Elected Fellow of the American Geophysical Union
 2004 National Science Foundation Antarctica Service Medal
 2013 American Geophysical Union William Gilbert Award
 2017 Elected Fellow of the American Association for the Advancement of Science

Selected publications

Personal life 
Constable is married to geophysicist Steven Constable.

References 

Living people
Year of birth missing (living people)
Earth scientists
Scripps Institution of Oceanography faculty
Geology award winners
University of Western Australia alumni
Australian National University alumni
Geophysicists